Parides burchellanus is a species of swallowtail butterfly (family Papilionidae). It is endemic to Brazil.

Description
Parides burchellanus is a large, velvet-black butterfly. The forewing is unmarked except for small, white marginal spots. The underside of the hindwing has small, red postdiscal spots. These are smaller and paler on the lower surface. The hindwing has a scalloped outer margin and a large androconial hair-pouch on the anal margin of the male. There are no tails. Apart from the hair-pouch, the sexes are alike.
A full description is provided by Rothschild, W. and Jordan, K. (1906)

Biology
The food plants of the larva are Aristolochia chamissonia and A. melastoma.

Taxonomy
Parides burchellanus is a member of the Parides aeneas species group and may be conspecific with, Parides aeneas. A suggested intermediate is known. 

The aeneas group members are
Parides aeneas 
Parides aglaope 
Parides burchellanus 
Parides echemon 
Parides eurimedes 
Parides lysander 
Parides neophilus 
Parides orellana 
Parides panthonus 
Parides tros 
Parides zacynthus

Habitat and threats
P. burchellanus is a rare species or, if it is a subspecies, an evolutionarily significant unit, of butterfly (Lepidoptera, Papilionoidea) that lives in a very few areas in central Brazil. Its close relation with a highly peculiar environment (gallery or riparian forest along rivers running through the cerrado landscape) restricts its occurrence to a few points. The frailty of its habitat, towards the increasing of loss of natural environments, makes it a target prone to elimination.

The Parides burchellanus is associated with riparian forests in Brazil, in which these rare butterflies tend to inhabit narrow streams among sectors in which the river is cut off by the forest canopy.

References

Edwin Möhn, 2006 Schmetterlinge der Erde, Butterflies of the World Part XXVI (26), Papilionidae XIII. Parides. Edited by Erich Bauer and Thomas Frankenbach Keltern: Goecke & Evers; Canterbury: Hillside Books.  (Supplement 13 in English - by Racheli)

burchellanus
Fauna of Brazil
Endemic fauna of Brazil
Papilionidae of South America
Taxonomy articles created by Polbot
Butterflies described in 1872